The North Yuba AVA is an American Viticultural Area in Yuba County, California, United States. The appellation is located at the northwest end of the Sierra Nevada, and the soil is primarily volcanic, with dense plutonic rock.

References 

American Viticultural Areas
American Viticultural Areas of California
Geography of Yuba County, California
1985 establishments in California